Lucien Leon Hauman-Merck (8 July 1880, in Ixelles – 16 September 1965, in Brussels) was a Belgian botanist, who studied and collected plants in South America and Africa.

He received his education in Gembloux, and afterwards relocated to Argentina, where he obtained a position in the department of agronomy and veterinary medicine at the University of Buenos Aires. From 1904 to 1925 he taught classes in botany, plant pathology and agricultural microbiology at the university. In 1910 he laid the foundations for its botanical garden.

In Argentina he conducted important phytogeographical research, and he also performed plant collection duties that involved excursions to Paraguay, Chile and Uruguay. In 1927 he returned to Europe, where from 1928 to 1949, he served as a professor of botany at the Free University of Brussels. During this time period, he studied African flora, about which, he collected numerous plants in the Belgian Congo. In 1949 he returned to Argentina as an honorary professor at the University of Buenos Aires. The "Jardín Botánico Lucien Hauman" at the university is named in his honor.

The genera Haumania (J.Léonard, 1949) and Haumaniastrum (P.A.Duvign. et Plancke, 1959) commemorate his name, as do species with the epithet of haumanii.

Honours 
 1932 : Commander in the Order of Leopold.

Selected works 
Note préliminaire sur les Hordeum spontanés de la flore Argentine
 Catalogue des phanérogames de l'Argentine, 1917 – Catalog of phanerogams native to Argentina.
 La végétation des hautes cordillères de Mendoza, 1918 – Vegetation of the high Cordillera of Mendoza.
 Le végétation de l'île de Martín García dans le Río de la Plata, 1925 – Vegetation of Martín García Island in the Rio de Plata.
 , 1947 – Vegetation of Argentina.

References

External links

Inter-American Institute of Agricultural Sciences, Asociación Latinoamericana de Fitotecnia, Las Ciencias agrícolas en América Latina: progreso y futuro.

Hauman,Lucien Leon
Hauman,Lucien Leon
Hauman,Lucien Leon
People from Ixelles
20th-century Belgian botanists
Academic staff of the Free University of Brussels (1834–1969)
Academic staff of the University of Buenos Aires
Botanists active in South America